Olajide Adebayo is an Anglican bishop in Nigeria; he is Bishop of Igbomina-West, one of eight in the  Anglican Province of Kwara, itself one of 14 within the Church of Nigeria. He presents Hymns of Praise Sundays 8pm on Metro FM, Lagos.

Notes

1958 births
Living people
21st-century Anglican bishops in Nigeria
Lagos State University alumni
Anglican bishops of Igbomina-West
Church of Nigeria archdeacons